Gerrhopilus tindalli, also known commonly as the Nilgiri Hills worm snake or Tindall's worm snake, is a species of harmless blind snake in the family Gerrhopilidae. The species is native to southern India. There are no recognized subspecies.

Etymology
The specific name, tindalli, is in honor of Roger Tindall.

Geographic range
G. tindalli is found in India in the Nilgiri Hills, Malabar District. The type locality given is "Nilambur, Malabar district" [India].

Habitat
The preferred natural habitat of G. tindalli is forest.

Reproduction
G. tindalli is oviparous.

References

Further reading

Smith MA (1943). The Fauna of British India, Ceylon and Burma, Including the Whole of the Indo-Chinese Sub-region. Reptilia and Amphibia. Vol. III.—Serpentes. London: Secretary of State for India. (Taylor and Francis, printers). xii + 583 pp. (Typhlops tindalli, new species, pp. 53–54).
Vidal N, Marin J, Morini M, Donnellan S, Branch WR, Thomas R, Vences M, Wynn A, Cruaud C, Hedges SB (2010). "Blindsnake evolutionary tree reveals long history on Gondwana". Biology Letters 6: 558-561. (Gerrhopilus tindalli, new combination).

tindalli
Reptiles of India
Endemic fauna of the Western Ghats
Reptiles described in 1943